The Benewah-class barracks ship was a class of barracks ships of the United States Navy after the Second World War, in the late 1940s.

Development 
Thirteen ships were converted into repair ships throughout the later stages of World War II. The ships were converted from the LST-1 and LST-542 classes. After the war, a few ships were then sold to the Philippines and Indonesia.

The ship's hulls remained nearly the same but with new equipment to carry out their purpose were placed on deck alongside several cranes. The ships' armament was slightly changed and relocated to make way for the ships' equipment. All ships served in the Pacific Theater until the end of the war with no ships lost in combat.

APL-40 (ex-USS Nueces) is still active to this day, serving as a transport and berthing vessel for the United States Navy in Yokosuka. APL-39 (ex-USS Mercer) also now berthed in Sasebo.

Ships of class

External links

Citations

 
Auxiliary ship classes of the United States Navy